Shelburne Museum is a museum of art, design, and Americana located in Shelburne, Vermont, United States. Over 150,000 works are exhibited in 39 exhibition buildings, 25 of which are historic and were relocated to the museum grounds. It is located on  near Lake Champlain.

Impressionist paintings, folk art, quilts and textiles, decorative arts, furniture, American paintings, and an array of 17th- to 20th-century artifacts are on view. Shelburne is home to collections of 19th-century American folk art, quilts, 19th- and 20th-century decoys, and carriages.

Electra Havemeyer Webb was a pioneering collector of American folk art, and founded Shelburne Museum in 1947. The daughter of Henry Osborne Havemeyer and Louisine Elder Havemeyer, important collectors of Impressionism, European and Asian art, she exercised an independent eye and passion for art, artifacts, and architecture celebrating a distinctly American aesthetic.

When creating the museum, she took the step of collecting 18th and 19th century buildings from New England and New York in which to display the museum's holdings, relocating 20 historic structures to Shelburne. These include houses, barns, a meeting house, a one-room schoolhouse, a lighthouse, a jail, a general store, a covered bridge, and the 220-foot steamboat Ticonderoga.

In Shelburne Mrs. Webb sought to create "an educational project, varied and alive." Shelburne's collections are exhibited in a village-like setting of historic New England architecture, accented by a landscape that includes over 400 lilacs, a circular formal garden, herb and heirloom vegetable gardens, and perennial gardens.

In 2013, the Pizzagalli Center for Art and Education was opened with two galleries, an auditorium, and a classroom, transforming the institution from seasonal (mid-May through October) to year-round operation.

History
The museum's collection was begun by Electra Havemeyer Webb, one of the first people to recognize the applied and decorative arts of rural America as collectible. Webb was an avid collector of American folk art and founded the museum in 1947. She took the step of relocating historic buildings from New England and New York to Shelburne in which to display the museum's holdings.

The museum has lost money and was said to have had a deficit of more than $300,000 in 1994.

Collections

The core of the collection was formed by Electra Havemeyer Webb, a pioneering collector of American folk art who founded Shelburne Museum. Mrs. Webb exchanged ideas with other major early collectors, including Katherine Prentis Murphy, Henry and Helen Flynnt and Henry Francis du Pont (who founded the Winterthur Museum and credited Mrs. Webb with inspiring him to collect American decorative arts).

Since Mrs. Webb's death in 1960, the collections have developed with an emphasis on folk art and contemporary art as it relates to the collection. Artifacts provide insight into the craftsmanship and artistic quality of objects made and used by three centuries of Americans. Visitors experience these objects in galleries and period rooms and through interactive exhibitions and demonstrations. Transportation, farming and trade artifacts illustrate America's industrial development from the 18th to the early 20th centuries. These collections are increasingly relevant to regional audiences from varied backgrounds as the economic base of the community shifts away from farming and small-scale production.

Shelburne Museum's purpose is to enrich people's lives through art, history and culture. The collection of approximately 150,000 objects is one of the most extensive and varied collections in the US and is notable for its great range, quality and depth. The outstanding collections of fine, folk and decorative art celebrate American ingenuity, creativity and craftsmanship.

Shelburne's folk art collection includes 1,400 wildfowl decoys and miniature carvings, 150 trade figures and signs, 120 weathervanes and 50 carousel figures, including all 40 animals from an early Dentzel carousel. The circus collection includes 600 historic posters, letters and memorabilia from P.T. Barnum, and the hand-carved 3,500 piece Kirk Brothers Miniature Circus. The Roy Arnold Circus Parade recreates in miniature 112 attractions from the Buffalo Bill Wild West Show, Yankee Circus, and Ringling Bros. and Barnum & Bailey Circus in 525 linear feet of a special exhibition building.

Textiles include 770 bed coverings (including 500 quilts), 400 hooked and sewn rugs, early household textiles (1,800 samplers, laces and linens) and 2,800 costumes and accessories. The decorative arts collection has 6,650 pieces, including glass, ceramics, pewter, metalwork, scrimshaw and one of the country's best regional collections of 18th- and 19th-century painted furniture. Over 1,000 dolls, 27 dollhouses and 1,200 doll accessories echo in miniature the museum's collections of ceramics, furniture and other household furnishings. A major reinterpretation and related publication of the doll collection was completed in 2004. The collection of American and European toys dates from the beginning of the 19th century.

At the museum there are some 3,200 American prints, paintings, drawings and graphics that relate to daily life. American paintings include works by Bierstadt, Cassatt, Chase, Copley, Heade, Homer, Eastman Johnson, Lane, Grandma Moses, Peto and Andrew Wyeth. A significant group of European paintings and pastels from the renowned Havemeyer collection includes works by Corot, Daubigny, Degas, Manet and Monet; they are exhibited in furnished rooms re-created from the Webbs' New York apartment, c. 1930, and are the only Impressionism pictures on public view in Vermont.

Collections also include 225 horse-drawn vehicles (described as one of the best in the nation by Merri Ferrell, formerly curator of vehicles at the Long Island Museum of Art, History and Carriages); 1,000 farming implements; and 5,000 hand tools that document woodworking, metalsmithing, coopering, weaving and spinning, leatherworking and woodcarving trades. Craftspeople staff working exhibits of blacksmithing, printing, spinning and weaving. An apothecary shop/physician's office displays 2,000 patent medicines and turn of the 20th century medical instruments.

The collections are exhibited in a setting of 38 exhibition buildings, 25 of which were relocated to the museum; the 1871 Colchester Reef Light; three historic and three replica barns, including a 1901 Vermont round barn; a vintage operating carousel; blacksmith and wheelwright shops; a weaving shop with an operating Jacquard loom; a working exhibit of late 19th-century printing equipment; an 1840 one-room schoolhouse; an 1890 Vermont slate jail; an 1840 general store; a rare 18th-century up-and-down sawmill; a 19th-century covered bridge with two lanes and a footpath; the reconstructed office of noted Vermont physician D. C. Jarvis; an 1890 railroad station; a 1914 steam locomotive and 1890 private rail car; and the 1906  steamboat Ticonderoga, which is a U.S. National Historic Landmark.

Controversy

Sale of art 
In 1996 the museum sold $30 million of its art to pay expenses. J. Watson Webb Jr., the son of Electra Havemeyer Webb, resigned in protest. Webb believed that the sale violated the code of ethics of the American Alliance of Museums, which forbids the selling of artworks for purposes other than acquiring more art. The funds from the sale were used to establish a Collections Care Endowment which is used to support the ongoing remedial and preventative conservation, storage and management of the museum's collection.

Buildings

Apothecary Shop
Beach Lodge and Gallery
Ben Lane Print Shop
Blacksmith Shop
Brick House
Castleton Jail
Charlotte Meeting House
Circus Building
Colchester Reef Lighthouse
Covered Bridge
Diamond Barn
Dorset House
Dutton House
Electra Havemeyer Webb Memorial Building
General Store
Hat and Fragrance Textile Gallery
Horseshoe Barn and Annex
Owl Cottage Activity Center
Pizzagalli Center for Art and Education
Pleissner Gallery
Prentis House
Rail Car Grand Isle
Rail Locomotive No. 220
Round Barn
Shelburne Museum Cafe
Shelburne Railroad Station and Freight Shed
Vergennes Schoolhouse
Settlers' House
Shaker Shed
Stagecoach Inn
Stencil House
Stone Cottage and Smokehouse
Ticonderoga (steamboat)
The Toy Shop
Variety Unit
Vermont House
Weaving Shop
Webb Gallery

Images

See also
List of Vermont museums

References

Further reading
Hill, Ralph Nading and Lilian Baker Carlisle. The Story of The Shelburne Museum. 1955.
Shelburne Museum. 1993. Shelburne Museum: A Guide to the Collections. Shelburne: Shelburne Museum, Inc.

External links

 
 Electra Havemeyer Webb.
Karp, Walter, "Electra Webb And Her American Past", American Heritage, April/May 1982 (Vol. 33, # 3).
Becker, Julie, "Lifelong fascination: Lilian Baker Carlisle", Vermont Woman, December 2004. "At first I was just [Electra Webb's] social secretary," Carlisle says.
 "The Influences Behind the Shelburne Museum", Saint Michael's College.
 Michod, Heather, "Electra's Cultural Jewel at Shelburne Museum", Vermont Woman, May, 2004.
 Hakala, Sonja, "'Collector's gene' yields a trove of Americana: Electra Webb made Shelburne Museum her monument", The Boston Globe, September 12, 2004.
Rothstein, Edward, "Critic's Notebook: The Art of Collecting Collections", The New York Times, May 20, 2011. "Museum ... brings new meaning to the word eclectic."

 
Museums established in 1947
1947 establishments in Vermont
Museums in Shelburne, Vermont
Decorative arts museums in the United States
Folk art museums and galleries in Vermont
Textile museums in the United States
History museums in Vermont
Open-air museums in Vermont
Transportation museums in Vermont
Havemeyer family